Richard C. Manning is an Australian development expert. He served as Chairman of UNICEF from 1984 to 1985.

Manning has worked at the World Bank, served as a senior officer of the Australian Development Assistance Bureau, and was Executive Secretary of the Committee to Review the Australian Aid Program. He has worked on development projects in Latin America and Asia. He was Chairman of the UNlCEF Committee on Administration and Finance 1981–1982, Vice Chairman of the Executive Board 1983–1984 and Chairman 1984–1985. He has also been a visiting fellow at the Development Studies Centre of the Australian National University.

References

Chairmen and Presidents of UNICEF
Australian public servants
Year of birth missing (living people)
Living people
Australian officials of the United Nations